Parliamentary elections were held in Hungary on 24 August 1963. In the communist system the Hungarian Socialist Workers' Party was the only party that was allowed to contest the elections, and won 252 of the 340 seats, with the remaining 88 going to independents selected by the party.

Results

References

Elections in Hungary
Parliamentary
Hungary
One-party elections

hu:Országgyűlési választások a Magyar Népköztársaságban#1963